Contemporânea (Portuguese for "Contemporary")  was a Portuguese review published in Lisbon from 1922 until 1926.

The project had as the target of the tlites In Contemporânea crystallized the modernism in the 1920s and you taste something mundane, its political tendency of the right.  Its publications totalled three numbers and the review turned it into a point of support by many "new" artistrs, which reprinted profusely.

Between its numerous contributors, it included the great Fernando Pessoa, Almada Negreiros, Mário de Sá Carneiro, Eduardo Viana, Diogo de Macedo, Mário Saa, Oliveira Mouta, António Ferro, Ernesto do Canto, António Botto, Raul Leal, Aquilino Ribeiro, António Soares, Mily Possoz, Stuart Carvalhais, Manuel Jardim, Luís de Montalvor, Jorge Barradas, Sculptor Francisco Franco, Henrique Franco, Dordio Gomes, Amadeo de Souza-Cardoso (posthumously), Alfredo Pimenta, João Vaz, Fortunato Velez, etc.

The review was associated with the artist school which styled Café A Brasileira and Bristol Club in Lisbon, and the Fall (Autumn) Salon at the National Society of Fine Arts in 1926.

See also
List of publications at the Hemeroteca Municipal de Lisboa

References

External links
Contemporânea, digital copy at  Digital , accessed on 3 May 2013

1922 establishments in Portugal
1926 disestablishments in Portugal
Defunct literary magazines published in Europe
Defunct magazines published in Portugal
Magazines established in 1922
Magazines disestablished in 1926
Magazines published in Lisbon
Portuguese-language magazines
Literary magazines published in Portugal